The Māngere River is a river of the Northland Region of New Zealand's North Island.

At the annual New Zealand River Awards in 2014, it was awarded "Most Improved."

See also
List of rivers of New Zealand

References

External links

Rivers of the Northland Region
Rivers of New Zealand
Kaipara Harbour catchment